Baseball is a growing minor sport in France. The sport in France is managed by the French Federation of Baseball and Softball, founded in October 1924. The first match played on French soil dates back to March 8 1889 as part of the Spalding World Tour
 while a first championship was born before the First World War. Despite these ancient roots, baseball is perceived in France as an exotic sport in the American image. The French media give it very little space.

Recognized as a high level sport by the Ministry of Sports, baseball takes full advantage of the characteristic structures of French sport, DTN and high level poles first and foremost. This training-oriented policy has borne fruit with encouraging first results, such as the 11th place of the French junior team at the World Championship in 2010 with a first international French victory and the signing of four French with professional organizations of Major Leagues between 2007 and 2012: Joris Bert, Frédéric Hanvi, Andy Paz and Alexandre Roy

The French national team remains behind the two strong European nations: Italy and the Netherlands. The situation is similar in club baseball, but the Rouen Huskies showed that it was possible to shake up the European hierarchy by reaching the final of the European Baseball Cup in 2007 and the semifinal in 2012.

History

From the origins to 1914: dreams full of head 

The first Spalding tour which passed in 1874 through England and Ireland was also to occur in Paris but the match scheduled is canceled. The first baseball match played on French soil finally took place on March 8 1889 on the occasion of the international exhibition, in the part of the Spalding World Tour, at the Parc Aérostatique de Paris in front of 1500 spectators. The game was between a selection of players from the National League and the club, Chicago White Stockings. Albert Spalding prioritizes this game because he feels the Paris market holds a lot of promise.

The  Los Angeles Times  devotes on May 17 1908 an article on the development of baseball in France. The Americans in Paris but also French players have been practicing since the last decade of the 19th century. In the wake of the match of March 8 1889, the main Parisian school clubs have set up thèque or baseball sections. According to ongoing research by Patrick Tugault, the Athletic Association of Lycée Janson-de-Sailly seems to be a pioneer (1890) before the École alsacienne, Lycée Saint-Louis and Lycée Hoche (1891). The Stade français (1893) then the Racing Club de France (1897) follow the movement as well as the Anglo-Saxon Parisian establishments : Anglo American AC (1897) and Anglo-Saxon School AC (1898), for example.

The industrialist Émile Dubonnet became a baseball fan in 1911. Enthusiastic about the future of the discipline in France, he helped in 1913 to finance the first national championship. The Parisian hen is based on the championship of the  Paris Baseball Association, chaired by the American Frank B. Ellis, while a provincial group is formed. In Paris, the main clubs are Ranelagh BBC (Bagatelle), Spalding AC (Vésinet), Paris Team (American students from Paris), A.A. (Lycée Condorcet) and the Racing Club de France. In the provinces, we can cite Rugby Nantes, Olympique Seynois, Évreux AC, US Berry and AS Macon.

In 1914, the year opens with the passage to Nice then to Paris of the world tour of Chicago White Sox and the New York Giants. On February 13, Chicago won 10–9 in Nice after a good match. After several days of rain, the Paris match is finally held despite bad weather conditions.

France acquired many fields and baseball began to attract crowds and as a result there were up to 3,000 spectators at a single championship match at Le Vésinet. Spalding, who also supports the young French league, is delighted by this development and declares that "the next country of baseball will be France". The outbreak of World War I drastically ended these hopes.

1914-1945: from one war to another 
During the First World War, Canadian soldiers were the first to practice baseball in their free time on the French front. The Canadians initiate many British and French soldiers, who are described as "enthusiastic practitioners" by the " New York Times" in 1915. Arrived in 1918, the Americans multiply the meetings. Thus, on July 4, 1918, nearly 20,000 spectators attended Rouen a match between American soldiers . Many Major League players were present in the US military and on the field.

At the end of the war, baseball entered the university, notably in Paris, Toulouse, Lyon, Nice and Dijon  while the bats are now produced locally. Christy Mathewson who is stationed in France is very reserved on the level of French players declaring in 1919 to "The Washington Post" that they have more afraid of a baseball than a German grenade. John McGraw, on the other hand, is more optimistic.

In 1920, the Standard AC won the Paris championship organized by the Parisian baseball league. The following year, the National Baseball League was founded. Chaired by Gaston François, it brings together the League of Paris and that of the North. Its objectives are to popularize the practice in France, to provide Paris with facilities to practice this sport and obtain recognition from the Olympic Committee.

On the occasion of the Summer Olympics in Paris in 1924, an exhibition match is being held on July 18 in between a formation named All Stars USA and the Ranelagh BBC. The Americans win 5–0. At the end of the summer, on August 31, a match pompously baptized the European World Series, opposes the Stade Elisabeth Stadium in Paris, selections of Parisian and London players. The Paris All Stars win by 15 to 8 over the London Americans. After having already won in London for the first leg a few days earlier.

In November 1924, two teams of the Major League Baseball meet in a friendly match in Paris: New York Giants and Boston Red Sox in front of 4000 spectators. In the wake of this meeting, the French Federation of baseball and thèque was created. Frantz Reichel is the president while John McGraw and Charles Comiskey are named honorary vice-presidents. Reichel's motivations remain mysterious. Officially, he "organizes" baseball in France; unofficially, he muzzles him. Two facts illustrate this situation. Reichel does not recognize the American primacy over the discipline and especially puts forward the thèque, but also, and above all, France, and all of Europe, will no longer receive the American Major League tours. However, two groups made the trip to Europe in 1926, but no one wanted to see them play, in Paris or in London. This last American tour in Europe will be satisfied with matches in Ireland. In fact, Reichel is one of the leading figures in the fight against professionalism and he is afraid that baseball will experience this development on the Old Continent. 1924 indeed marks a turning point at this level with the adoption of professionalism by Austrian football; a first in continental Europe for a team sport.

The federation set up a French championship in 1926 which incorporated a few clubs from the Parisian baseball league such as Sporting Bedford Eco, Paris Champion in 1923. AS Transport won the first national title on August 22 in 1926 by winning 15–10 in the final at Colombes against Ranelagh BBC.

Initiated to play during the war, the French army continued its practice during the 1920s and even considered adopting it as an official sport for training soldiers. This idea was abandoned in the 1930s.

In 1929, the France team made their debut against their Spanish counterpart. The French won 10–6 at Barcelona on the occasion of this first outing. In the 1930s, the France - Netherlands opposition became a classic. The Dutch won the first opposition in Paris 9–5, then won again in Amsterdam. The French take away their first victory in the third match, in Paris, 5–4. A three-way tournament with the Belgium takes place at the end of the 1930s.

1945-1980: relaunch failure 
The Second World War marks a severe halt to baseball in France. Ihis was not the case in the Netherlands. At the Liberation, French baseball was in ruins. The American soldiers reintroduced the sport and multiplied the meetings, even in the medium-sized towns (Auxerre, Compiègne, etc.). The 33rd Division Blackcats are the most famous training of the summer 1945. They had a few Major League players including Dave Koslo, pitcher for the New York Giants, and Merv Connors, first base for the Chicago White Sox. They have 30 wins for 4 losses.

President of the French baseball Federation since 1931, Georges Bruni is very close to Reichel's theses, but he is a genuine fan of the game. His action remains limited until 1945, when replacement by Thierry Blanchard (1945 - 1955). It was under the latter's authority that the Confederation of European Baseball was created in Paris on April 27, 1953. France even manages to impose the exclusive use of a French vocabulary on the whole of Europe. This does not last long. In exchange, the posts of president, vice-president and secretary are left to Italians, Spaniards and Belgians.

Between 1944 and the 1950s, a solid nucleus developed in Tunisia, then still under French authority. The Americans are at the origin of this movement while the Tunisian League has been active since 1920 is mainly the work of Marcel Cohen. The first matches between the French team and the selection of Tunisia are favorable to African players (11-5 in 1949). The French team of 1955 which participates in the European championship includes many of these Tunisian players. Despite this reinforcement, France signs four defeats for no success in this competition. These mediocre results remained the norm until the 1980s. Between 1955 and 1983, the French team only had 2 victories for 39 defeats in the European championship.

Since 1980 
Only 21 clubs were active in France in 1976. In ten years, we have grown to more than 170 clubs and in 1989, France hosted the 21st edition of the European Baseball Championship. For the occasion, land meeting international standards is being built in the Bois de Vincennes. According to a census carried out by the Confederation of European Baseball, France has in 2006 153 fields including 13 with international standards, 30 fields entirely dedicated to baseball and 110 other fields. France had the opportunity to take advantage of the organization in Paris of a group for the 2009 World Cup to equip themselves, but the Federation prefers to give up organizing these meetings, due to lack of stadiums and commitment partners, the International Baseball Federation first and foremost.

The purely amateur character of French baseball is now a thing of the past. Foreign players and coaches can now hope to earn a few thousand euros per month by playing in French clubs. The cases are still rare, but they exist since the years 1990. Thus, the Canadian Steve Scagnetti receives a monthly salary of $2500 during his time with the Lions of Savigny-sur-Orge. The best player playing in France during the 1990s is the Canadian Jeff Zimmerman who takes advantage of the low level of opposition to develop his shots. He is very critical of the level of play in the French championship, which he assesses at the same level as the junior colleges in the United States. Zimmerman went on to play in Major League from 1999 to 2001 and had a selection All-Star (1999).

The departure of the young center fielder of the Rouen Huskies, Joris Bert, in the school clubs of the Los Angeles Dodgers in 2007  confirms the effectiveness of the training policy put in place with the support of the Ministry of Sports and the MLB. The American Major League also organizes training camps in France in order to observe the evolution of young French players and direct the best to the United States. A few months after Joris Bert, the young Frédéric Hanvi was recruited by the organization of Minnesota Twins. In January 2011, the Franco-Cuban Andy Paz-Garriga signed with the Oakland Athletics.

On June 16, 2007, the Rouen Huskies take part in the final of the European Cup. This great first for a French club ended in a 3–1 defeat against the Dutch Kinheim. Two years later, Rouen managed to win in a group match against the Champions of Netherlands, the Amsterdam Pirates (8-5 in 6 sets, match interrupted by rain). This is the first French victory in the European Cup against a Dutch club.

In 2012 the Rouen Huskies once again qualify for the European  semi-final   but lost in the semi-final against the Italians from Bologna. The same year Alexandre Roy became the 4th Frenchman to sign a professional contract with a franchise of Major League Baseball, the Seattle Mariners.

Also in 2012, France won the European Under-21 Championship, the first European title of the Federation since its creation, and the Senior France Team participates in World Baseball Classic Qualifying Round, a new benchmark international competition.

Governing board

The sport is governed by the French Federation of Baseball and Softball.

Domestic League

The French Division 1 Baseball Championship is the highest level of professional baseball in the country.

Bibliography
Baseball in Europe, A county by country history by McFarland & Co

References